Margarita Conde (born 19 June 1960) is a Guatemalan long-distance runner. In 2001, she competed in the women's marathon at the 2001 World Championships in Athletics held in Edmonton, Alberta, Canada. She finished in 49th place.

References

External links 
 

Living people
1960 births
Place of birth missing (living people)
Guatemalan female long-distance runners
Guatemalan female marathon runners
World Athletics Championships athletes for Guatemala